McBrien is an Irish surname. Notable people with the surname include:

Fred McBrien (1888–1938), Canadian lawyer, businessman, and politician
Likely McBrien (1892–1956), leading Australian rules football administrator
Richard McBrien (1936–2015), the Crowley-O'Brien Professor of Theology at the University of Notre Dame
Scott McBrien (born 1980), former American football quarterback
William C. McBrien (1889–1954), Canadian business owner and civic administrator

See also
Donnchad mac Briain (died 1064), son of Brian Bóruma and Gormflaith ingen Murchada, King of Munster
William McBrien Building, the administrative headquarters of the Toronto Transit Commission
MacBrien